The following is a timeline of the history of the city of Mainz, Germany.

Prior to 19th century

 13/12 BC - Roman fort Mogontiacum built.
 314 - Roman Catholic Diocese of Mainz established (approximate date).
 406 - Battle of Mainz (406).
 790s - Benedictine St. Alban's Abbey active (approximate date).
 813 - Carolingian rhine bridge (Mainz)  (bridge) burns down.
 848 - Gottschalk of Orbais convicted of heresy while in Mainz.
 952 - Forces of Otto I, Holy Roman Emperor fought forces of Liudolf, Duke of Swabia and Conrad, Duke of Lorraine in Mainz for 2 months.
 1009 - Mainz Cathedral finished and burnt down during inauguration.
 1160 - "Citizens revolted against archbishop Arnold of Selenhofen."
 1163 - City wall dismantled.
 1184 - Diet of Pentecost occurs.
 1244 -  established.
 1314 -  church built.
 1340 - St. Stephen's Church built.
 1370 - Public clock installed (approximate date).
 1454/5 - Johannes Gutenberg prints a Bible using movable type and a printing press; printing revolution launched.
 1461/2 - Mainz Diocesan Feud occurs.
 1477 - University of Mainz founded.
 1481 - Martinsburg, Mainz (castle) built.
 1561 - Jesuit Kurfürstliches Kolleg (school) founded.
 1631 - City occupied by Swedish forces during the Thirty Years' War.
 1604 - Old arsenal built.
 1644 - City occupied by French forces during the Thirty Years' War.
 1660 - Citadel built in the Fortress of Mainz.
 1670 -  built.
 1678 - Electoral Palace, Mainz built.
 1689 -  during the Nine Years' War.
 1736 - Arsenal built.
 1750 - Bassenheimer Hof built.
 1754 -  (scholarly society) established.
 1770 - Schott Music publisher in business.
 1781 - Altmünster Cistercian abbey dissolved.
 1792 - October: Siege of Mainz (1792) by the French Revolutionary Armies under Adam-Philippe de Custine.
 1793
 March: Republic of Mainz established.
 14 April: Siege of Mainz (1793) begins.
 23 July: Siege ends; Republic dissolved.
 1797 - Mainz "ceded to France by the Treaty of Campo Formio."
 1798 - University of Mainz suppressed by the French.

19th century

 1803 - "Hall of Antiques" exhibited.
 1805 -  (library) established.
 1814
 Siege of Mainz (1814) defended by French forces under Charles Antoine Morand.
 Mainz becomes part of Germany again.
 1817 -  (sport club) formed.
 1827 -  (bank) founded.
 1833 - Staatstheater Mainz built.
 1837
  (carnival society) established, the first of many.(de)
 Gutenberg monument(de) erected on the Gutenbergplatz (Mainz).
 1838
  (parade) begins.
  (another carnival society) established.
 1844 -  (historical society) founded.
 1845 -  history journal begins publication.
 1848 - Political unrest.
 1853 - Mainz–Ludwigshafen railway begins operating.
 1854 - Mainzer Anzeiger newspaper in publication (founded in 1850 as an advertisement paper)
 1857 - 18 November:  explodes, damaging the  neighborhood.
 1861 - Population: 41,279.
 1862
 South railway bridge built.
  founded.
 1863 - Main Railway (Frankfurt-Mainz) begins operating.
 1866 -  barracks built (approximate date).
 1871 - Alzey–Mainz railway begins operating.
 1873 - Development of  begins.
 1884 - Mainz Hauptbahnhof and Mainz Süd train stations, and  built.
 1885 - Rheinbrücke (bridge) built.
 1887 - Zollhafen (port) opens near city.
 1890 - Population: 72,059.
 1899 - Rheinischer Camera-Klub founded.

20th century

 1901 - Gutenberg Museum opens.
 1904 - Kaiserbrücke (railway bridge) built.
 1905
 1. FSV Mainz 05 football club formed.
 Population: 91,124.
 1907 - Gustav Stresemann Business School founded.
 1908 - Kastel becomes part of Mainz.
 1912 -  (synagogue) built.
 1913 - Church of the Sacred Heart built.
 1919 - Population: 107,930.
 1927 - Theresianum Gymnasium Mainz (school) founded.
 1929 - Stadion am Bruchweg (stadium) opens.
 1930 - Bischofsheim becomes part of Mainz.
 1938 - Gonsenheim becomes part of Mainz.
 1941 - Bombing of Mainz in World War II begins.
 1945
 Bombing of Mainz in World War II ends.
 Mainz-Amöneburg becomes part of nearby city Wiesbaden.
 1946 - University of Mainz reactivated.
 1947 - Allgemeine Zeitung (Mainz) newspaper in publication.
 1949 - Academy of Sciences and Literature founded.
 1951 - Landtag of Rhineland-Palatinate begins meeting in the Deutschhaus Mainz.
 1953 - Rabanus-Maurus-Gymnasium (school) active.
 1958 - Iron Tower reconstructed.
 1961 - Wood Tower reconstructed.
 1962 - Schierstein Bridge built.
 1963 -  erected on the Schillerplatz.
 1964 -  borough created.
 1967 - Mittelrheinischen Landesmuseum Mainz established.
 1968 -  built.
 1981 - Mainz (journal) begins publication.
 1985 - Ancient  discovered in Kästrich.
 1987 -  (newspaper) begins publication.
 1989 -  borough new circumscripted.
 1997 - Jens Beutel becomes mayor.

21st century

 2010
 February: Storm.
 New synagogue Mainz built.
 2011 - Coface Arena opens.
 2012 - Michael Ebling becomes mayor.
 2013 - Population: 204,268.

See also
 Mainz history
 
 List of mayors of Mainz
 List of archbishops of Mainz until 1803
 

Other cities in the state of Rhineland-Palatinate:(de)
 Timeline of Koblenz

References

This article incorporates information from the German Wikipedia and French Wikipedia.

Bibliography

in English
 
 
 
 
 
 
 
 
 
 + 1882 ed.

in German

External links

 
 Links to fulltext city directories for Mainz via Wikisource
 Europeana. Items related to Mainz, various dates.
 Digital Public Library of America. Items related to Mainz, various dates

 
Years in Germany
Mainz
Mainz